Shirley Siaton, officially credited in bylines as Shirley O. Siaton, is a journalist and writer of fiction and poetry based in the Philippines. She is best known for the Center series that ran in MOD Filipina magazine, stories that chronicled the lives of members of a fictional Filipino pop-rock band.

Awards and credits 
In 1996, she was the champion of the Regional Secondary Schools Press Conference English Editorial contest and the silver medallist of the same category at the National level. She is also a recipient of the National Philippine Information Agency IWAG Award for Excellence in Journalism and the much-coveted Esteban Javellana Award for Creative Writing, both given in 1997.

Most of her fiction has been published in Philippine magazines such as MOD Filipina and Glitter. Her poetry was showcased in several issues of The Philippine Star. She has also worked as a columnist for Files Magazine, the weekly magazine of Panay News.

Writings 
These are Shirley Siaton's works, grouped by publication and by no means comprehensive:

Files Magazine
Telltale: The Oasis (23–29 January 1998)
Telltale: A Few Good Books (16–22 January 1998)
Telltale: Random Collisions (19–25 December 1997)

Glitter Magazine
Hobo (16–31 January 1996)

MOD Filipina Magazine
Blue Sunset (5 and 12 March 1999)-Center Series
Rivals (26 February 1999)-Center Series
The One (4 September 1998)-Center Series
Leaving the Mountain (21 August 1998)
Fires (27 June 1997)
Storms (24 January 1997)

The Philippine Star
Other (13 November 1998)
Foodcourt (18 September 1998)
Fudge (24 October 1997)
Who Cares (15 August 1997)
Shoes (19 July 1997)
Stone (3 May 1997)
Graduation Day (12 April 1997)
Passengers (30 November 1996)

She is also the author of two Filipino stageplays, Tatsulok (Triangle) and Gisi (Torn), both staged at the University of the Philippines Iloilo City campus in 1999.

References
Ayala Young Leaders
Panay News
Philippine eLibrary Archive
The Philippine Star

External links
Shirley Siaton's Official Website

Filipino writers
Living people
Filipino women writers
Year of birth missing (living people)